The Minister for Health of the Australian Capital Territory is the head of the ACT Health Directorate and appointed by the Chief Minister of the Australian Capital Territory.

The current Minister for Health is Rachel Stephen-Smith.

List of Ministers for Health

1 Ministerial role expanded on 19 October 2000 to include Housing, as well as Health and Community Care. Ministerial role expanded again on 15 December 2000 to include Health, Housing and Community Services.
2 Moore sat as an independent member in the Carnell and Humphries led Liberal governments.

External links
 ACT Health website

Minister for Health

Health in the Australian Capital Territory